Ching-Liang Lin (22 January 1931 – 18 November 2019) was a Taiwanese physicist and professor at National Taiwan University. She was the first woman to be head of the university's department of physics.

Life
She was born in 1931 in Takao Prefecture (present-day Kaoshiung). She graduated from Kaohsiung Municipal Kaohsiung Girls' Senior High School. She was a witness to the February 28 incident in 1947 which killed thousands in Taiwan and resulted in decades of martial law known as the White Terror. During this time, she chose to focus on the study of physics. She attended the University of Tokyo and was awarded a doctorate in physics in 1966. She returned to Taiwan in 1970 and was asked to create a physics department at Soowchow University. She married another academic, Feng Tsuan Hua, around 1972 and they left for a couple of years to work in Massachusetts in the United States at the University of Massachusetts, Amherst.

She became a professor of physics at the National Taiwan University. From 1981 to 1983 she was the head of the department of physics at the university. As of 2019 she is the only woman to hold this role. Whilst she was in charge she arranged an audit of the department and it was found that a radioactive source that was meant to be stored safely was missing. The newspapers reported the problem and it was only when national bodies became involved that the radium - beryllium neutron source was found. She wanted to concentrate on teaching so she stood down from her management role. She continued to teach for twenty years, and she was cited as a role model for other women to study physics.

She retired and died in 2019 at National Taiwan University Hospital.

Selected works
 Theory of Two Nucleon Stripping Reactions. I—(d, α) and (α, d) Reactions—, 1964
 Prog. Theor. Phys.vol 36 (1966) p. 251287. Theory of Two-Nucleon Transfer Reaction II.
 CL Lin, S. Yamaji and H. Yosbida: Nucl. Phys. Vol.A204 (1973 ) p. 135152. Finite Range Calculations of the Two-Nucleon Transfer Reactions.
 FJ Kline, CL Lin and GA Peterson: Nucl. Phys. vol.A241 (1975) p. 299310. Inelastic Electron Scattering from 31p.
 CL Lin and Kuo-Ping Li: Prog. Theor. Phys. vol. 81 (1989) p. 140159. Nuclear Exchange Currents in Quantum Hadrodynamics.

In addition she has a large number of patents in her name.

References

1931 births
2019 deaths
Taiwanese women physicists
Scientists from Kaohsiung
20th-century women scientists
21st-century women scientists
20th-century Taiwanese physicists
21st-century Taiwanese physicists
Academic staff of the National Taiwan University
Academic staff of Soochow University (Taiwan)
Taiwanese expatriates in the United States
University of Tokyo alumni
Taiwanese expatriates in Japan